Kevin Richard Kobel (born October 2, 1953) is a former professional baseball pitcher. Having made his major league debut with the Milwaukee Brewers a month shy of his twentieth birthday on September 8, he is the only pitcher in franchise history to make his major league debut as a teenager.

Career
Kobel was selected by the Milwaukee Brewers out of Saint Francis High School in Athol Springs, New York in the eleventh round (250th overall) of the 1971 Major League Baseball Draft. After three seasons in their farm system, in which he went 20–24 with a 3.60 earned run average, Kobel joined the Brewers as a September call-up in 1973. He began his major league career with a perfect inning of work in which he struck out the first two New York Yankees batters he faced and induced a weak ground ball to first base from the third. In his second inning, however, he surrendered a grand slam to light hitting shortstop Fred Stanley.

His first major league win also came against the Yankees on May 12, . Kobel held the Yankees scoreless on two hits through seven innings in the rain delayed second game of a doubleheader at Shea Stadium. After surrendering a home run to Rick Dempsey to lead off the eighth, the game was called due to rain. Kobel spent the entire 1974 season in the majors, compiling a 6–14 record and 3.99 ERA. He seemed to be at his best against the Yankees, as his ERA against the Yankees was 2.10, and three of those six wins were at their expense.

Following a  season spent in the minors, his contract was purchased by the New York Mets. He pitched parts of three seasons for the Mets, in which he went 12–18 with a 3.58 ERA. On June 17, he was traded to the Kansas City Royals for a player to be named later. He appeared in eight games for the triple A Omaha Royals.

References

External links
, or Arizona Major League Alumni, or The Ultimate Mets Database, or Retrosheet, or Mexican League, or Venezuelan Professional Baseball League

1953 births
Living people
American expatriate baseball players in Mexico
Baseball players from New York (state)
Indios de Ciudad Juárez (minor league) players
Leones de Yucatán players
Leones del Caracas players
American expatriate baseball players in Venezuela
Major League Baseball pitchers
Mexican League baseball pitchers
Milwaukee Brewers players
New York Mets players
Newark Co-Pilots players
Omaha Royals players
Portland Beavers players
Sacramento Solons players
San Antonio Brewers players
Shreveport Captains players
Spokane Indians players
Tidewater Tides players